The second season of One Tree Hill, an American teen drama television series, began airing on September 21, 2004 on The WB television network. The season concluded on May 24, 2005, after 23 episodes.

Season two increased in ratings, averaging 4.50 million viewers weekly, and was its highest rated season.

Warner Home Video released the complete second season, under the title of One Tree Hill: The Complete Second Season, on September 13, 2005, as a six-disc boxed set.

Overview
This season documents the core 5's remaining months of Junior year that started in season 1. Half-brothers Nathan and Lucas Scott were bitter rivals, both on and off the basketball court; now they bond as brothers. But there is drama, trauma, devotion, betrayal, twists and turns to come. To protect those he loves, Lucas moves in with Dan. Brooke and Peyton mend their friendship, but romantic turmoil gets cranked up. Newly married couple, Haley and Nathan's relationship is pushed to the brink when Haley gets the opportunity of a lifetime. Newcomers to Tree Hill push emotions into high gear. The vindictive Dan Scott is as usual controlling others like an evil puppet master. However, there are some things even he can't control.

Cast and characters

Regular
 Chad Michael Murray as Lucas Scott (23 episodes)
 James Lafferty as Nathan Scott (23 episodes)
 Hilarie Burton as Peyton Sawyer (22 episodes)
 Bethany Joy Lenz as Haley James Scott (20 episodes)
 Paul Johansson as Dan Scott (20 episodes)
 Sophia Bush as Brooke Davis (23 episodes)
 Barbara Alyn Woods as Deb Scott (17 episodes)
 Barry Corbin as Whitey Durham (12 episodes)
 Craig Sheffer as Keith Scott (16 episodes)
 Moira Kelly as Karen Roe (23 episodes)

Recurring
 Tyler Hilton as Chris Keller (18 episodes)
 Kieren Hutchison as Andy Hargrove (17 episodes)
 Lee Norris as Mouth McFadden (15 episodes)
 Daniella Alonso as Anna Taggaro (12 episodes)
 Michael Copon as Felix Taggaro (12 episodes)
 Bryan Greenberg as Jake Jagielski (10 episodes)
 Maria Menounos as Emily "Jules" Chambers (10 episodes)
 Brett Claywell as Tim Smith (8 episodes)
 Vaughn Wilson as Fergie Thompson (7 episodes) 
 Katherine Bailess as Erica Marsh (6 episodes)

 Antwon Tanner as Skills Taylor (5 episodes)
 Bevin Prince as Bevin Mirskey (5 episodes)
 Cullen Moss as Junk Moretti (5 episodes)
 Lindsey McKeon as Taylor James (5 episodes)
 Emmanuelle Vaugier as Nicki (4 episodes)
Shawn Shepard as Principal Turner (3 episodes)
 Bess Armstrong as Lydia James (2 episodes)
Sarah Edwards as Theresa (2 episodes)
 Michael Trucco as Cooper Lee (1 episode)

Episodes

Ratings

Home media
The DVD release of season two was released after the season has completed broadcast on television. It has been released in Regions 1, 2 and 4. As well as every episode from the season, the DVD release features bonus material such as audio commentaries on some episodes from the creator and cast, deleted scenes, gag reels and behind-the-scenes featurettes. The words "The WB Presents" were printed on the packaging before the "One Tree Hill" title, although they were not included on international releases as The WB was not the broadcaster.

References

One Tree Hill (TV series) seasons
2004 American television seasons
2005 American television seasons